Geoff Howells (1 September 1935 – 15 November 2022) was an Australian rules footballer who played with Hawthorn in the Victorian Football League (VFL).

Notes

External links 
		

1935 births
2022 deaths
Australian rules footballers from Victoria (Australia)
Hawthorn Football Club players